Passionflower is a 1952 Mexican crime film directed by Joaquín Pardavé and starring Meche Barba, Fernando Fernández and Freddy Fernández.

The film's art direction was by Jorge Fernández.

Cast
 Meche Barba as Lupita  
 Fernando Fernández as Ricardo  
 Freddy Fernández as El Pichi  
 Roberto G. Rivera as Jorge  
 Manuel Hernández as Manolo Hernández  
 Carlos Múzquiz as Don Luis  
 Pascual García Peña as Pascual  
 Rafael Icardo as Don Rodrigo  
 Manuel Dondé as Prisionero  
 Rafael Banquells as Juan  
 José René Ruiz as Medio litro  
 Isaac Norton as Cabezas  
 Pablo Marichal as Charolito
 José Chávez as Policía  
 Javier de la Parra as Agente policía  
 Agustín Fernández as Alma negra  
 Rogelio Fernández as Criado  
 Sara Guasch as Doña Rosa, madre de Ricardo  
 José Muñoz as Bernardo  
 Salvador Terroba

References

Bibliography

External links 
 

1952 films
1952 crime films
Mexican crime films
1950s Spanish-language films
Films directed by Joaquín Pardavé
Mexican black-and-white films
1950s Mexican films